The Lords of the North is the third historical novel in the Saxon Stories by Bernard Cornwell published in 2006. The story is set in the 9th century Anglo-Saxon kingdoms Wessex and Northumbria. Uhtred wants revenge against his uncle, and falls in love. He fights for both the Danes and for Alfred.

Plot summary

878 – 881: Uhtred of Bebbanburg makes his way back to his native Northumbria seeking revenge against his uncle Ælfric and childhood enemies Sven the One-Eyed and Kjartan the Cruel. He travels by ship with his lover and former nun, Hild. They make landfall near Eoferwic (York) to find the region in chaos. Ivarr Ivarsson, the most powerful Danish lord in Northumbria, has led his army against the Scots in the north. The formerly Danish-held Eoferwic has been conquered by Saxons, who, under the fanatical Father Hrothweard, have begun a massacre of Danes. The central lands of Dunholm are ravaged by Kjartan and Sven, and Bebbanburg remains under the control of Ælfric.

Uhtred is hired to escort a Danish merchant's family north, through Dunholm. Their path leads to a slave trading station belonging to Sven. In order to avoid being recognised, Uhtred hides his face and calls himself Thorkild the Leper, Dark Swordsman of Niflheim. When the situation spirals out of control, he convinces Sven he was returned from the dead to haunt him and his father. He frees the Dane Guthred of Cumbraland from the slave pens; the amiable Guthred claims to be the king of Northumbria.

In Cumbraland, Guthred converts to Christianity and is hailed as king of Northumbria by the Saxon Abbot Eadred, who believes Guthred has been anointed by Saint Cuthbert and claims to have dreamed of Guthred, though he initially mistakes Uhtred for him. Uhtred becomes the commander of Guthred's household troops, as well as his closest advisor. He trains a band of thirty new warriors and foils an attempt by Kjartan's infiltrators to capture him and Guthred. Uhtred is smitten with Guthred's sister, Gisela. He marches east with Guthred. With Ivarr Ivarsson away fighting the Scots, they capture Eoferwic easily. There Father Hrothweard joins them. As they march north to Dunholm, Guthred betrays Uhtred. He makes a deal with Uhtred's treacherous uncle, Ælfric, for his support against Kjartan. In return, Ælfric wants Uhtred dead, but Guthred gets him to accept something less. He pays Danish trader Sverri to take the unsuspecting Uhtred as a slave.

For two years, Uhtred is a rower on Sverri's trading ship. During that time, he befriends a fellow slave, Finan the Agile, an Irish warrior. Then a mysterious red Danish longship pursues their ship. During a trading venture to England, Uhtred is confronted by Sven, who recognises him, but is scared away when the red ship appears, and warriors debark and attack. Uhtred is overjoyed to be reunited with his foster brother and close friend, Ragnar. Uhtred returns to Wessex to learn that Hild convinced Alfred to send Ragnar (and Steapa) to his rescue, promising to use Uhtred's hoard of silver to build an abbey and recommit herself to Christ. Upon meeting with a Mercian traveling entertainer and spy, Offa, Uhtred learns that Guthred, Ivarr and Ælfric besieged Kjartan at Dunholm, but failed.

Alfred despatches Father Beocca as his ambassador to Guthred, supposedly to make peace in Northumbria, but also sends along Uhtred, Steappa and Ragnar, which convinces Uhtred that Alfred has other intentions. They arrive in Guthred's court to find that Gisela was married to Ælfric by proxy in return for support in another attack against Kjartan, and that Ivarr has abandoned Guthred and is raising an army to fight him. Uhtred is certain his uncle will send no men to support Guthred. He fends off Ælfric's men and kills Brother Jænberht when he insists that Gisela is still married to Ælfric. Intimidated, Brother Ida agrees that Gisela is not married, as the marriage has not been consummated. Uhtred then forgives Guthred for betraying him into slavery and declares his intention to marry Gisela. Despite the calls of many churchmen to instead execute Uhtred for the killing of Jænberht, Guthred agrees to the marriage.

Uhtred takes command of Guthred's troops for the attack on Dunholm. His plan is to once again become a sceadugengan, a shadow-walker. In the darkness, he and eleven of his best men climb the hill and sneak into the fort through a gate used to fetch well water. Although they are discovered, they are assisted by Ragnar's sister Thyra, who has been held by Sven and Kjartan since the events of The Last Kingdom. Thyra turns Kjartan's own hounds against their masters, allowing Uhtred and his men to open the gate for Ragnar and Guthred's army to enter the stronghold and beat Kjartan's men. Sven is defeated by Finan and then savaged to death by the hounds at Thyra's behest. Kjartan himself is killed in single combat by Ragnar, who refuses to allow him to die with a sword in his hand, thus denying him entry into Valhalla. After the battle, Guthred transfers control of Dunholm to Ragnar.

Guthred's army meets Ivarr's stronger force in the field. Uhtred provokes Ivarr into single combat and defeats him.

Characters in The Lords of the North
 Uhtred - the protagonist, narrator, dispossessed Ealdorman of Bebbanburg
 King Alfred of Wessex - The King of Wessex
 Guthrum/King Aethelstan - Danish and Christian King of East Anglia
 Guthred - Danish slave rescued by Uhtred and proclaimed King of Northumbria
 Gisela - Danish woman, sister of Guthred, marries Uhtred and provides him a son and a daughter.
 Hild - Saxon woman, a former nun who becomes Uhtred's companion
 Ragnar Ragnarsson - Danish Warlord, son of Earl Ragnar, and Uhtred's foster brother and close friend
 Ælfric - Uhtred's uncle and usurper of the throne of  Bebbanburg Father Beocca - Alfred's priest and Uhtred's family friend
 Kjartan the Cruel - Master of Dunholm, killer of Earl Ragnar the Fearless
 Sven the One-Eyed - One-eyed son of Kjartan, enemy of Uhtred
 Thyra Ragnarsdottir - Sister of Ragnar, kidnapped by Sven, eventually rescued and marries Father Beocca
 Ivarr Ivarsson - Danish Warlord, son of Ivar the Boneless
 Rypere - Saxon boy Uhtred trains
 Clapa - Danish boy Uhtred trains
 Sihtric Kjartansson - Kjartan's illegitimate son sworn to Uhtred
 Jænberht and Ida - Monks in the employ of Ælfric
 Abbot Eadred - Guthred's chief supporter and possessor of Saint Cuthbert's corpse
 Father Hrothweard - Priest in Eoferwic
 Tekil - Warrior employed by Kjartan
 Sverri Ravnsson - Danish trader from Jutland who buys Uhtred as a slave from
 Hakka - Sverri's Frisian right-hand man
 Finan the Agile''' - Irish slave and warrior Uhtred befriends

Publication details
 2006, UK, HarperCollins , Pub date 22 May 2006, hardback

References

2006 British novels
The Saxon Stories
HarperCollins books